The 2013–14 Montana State Bobcats men's basketball team represented Montana State University during the 2013–14 NCAA Division I men's basketball season. The Bobcats, led by eighth year head coach Brad Huse, played their home games at Worthington Arena and were members of the Big Sky Conference. They finished the season 14–17, 9–11 in Big Sky play to finish in ninth place. They failed to qualify for the Big Sky Conference tournament.

On March 18, head coach Brad Huse resigned after posting a record of 107–133 in eight seasons.

Roster

Schedule

|-
!colspan=9 style="background:#0a1f62; color:#c1b465;"| Exhibition

|-
!colspan=9 style="background:#0a1f62; color:#c1b465;"|  Regular Season

References

Montana State Bobcats men's basketball seasons
Montana State
Montana State Bobcats men's basketball
Montana State Bobcats men's basketball